Beat Beleza is the second album released by Brazilian singer Ivete Sangalo.

Charts

Certifications

References 

2000 albums
Ivete Sangalo albums